The  Clarence Cannon National Wildlife Refuge is located in the floodplain of the Mississippi River, adjacent to Pool No. 25 in Pike County, Missouri. The refuge's diversity of habitats supports waterfowl, wading birds, shorebirds, and songbirds. Although it is protected by a levee, the refuge provides flood storage in periods of high water.

Clarence Cannon Refuge is managed by Great River National Wildlife Refuge, which is part of the Mark Twain National Wildlife Refuge Complex.

See also
 Clarence Cannon

References
Refuge website

External links

National Wildlife Refuges in Missouri
Protected areas on the Mississippi River
Protected areas of Pike County, Missouri
Floodplains of the United States
Wetlands of Missouri
Landforms of Pike County, Missouri
Protected areas established in 1964
1964 establishments in Missouri